Khadke village is 2km away from Bhusawal, Jalgaon district, Maharashtra, India. The village has a population of 402 people and a total geographical area of 213.41 hectares (about 0.82398 square miles).  Most of the people in this village belong to the caste Leva Patil.

References 

Villages in Jalgaon district